Sonalika Prasad  (born 5 October 1992), is an Indian actress who predominantly works in Bhojpuri, Hindi films and television actress. She is a very well known personality for hosting events. She is known for her roles in television show CID (Indian TV series), Savdhaan India, Crime Petrol and films like Raajtilak & Laila Majnu.

Early life
Sonalika was born on 5 October 1992. She was born and brought up in Patna, Bihar. Prasad did her schooling in St. Karen's school (from 1st - 6th standard). Then she changed her school and entered Krishna Niketan school (from 7th - 10th) Patna, Bihar. She did her high school, graduation (Bachelor of Arts (Hons) in political science) and Post Graduation in mass communication From Patna women's college. Prasad was always interested to learn language and now she speaks Hindi, English, and Bhojpuri.

Prasad has stated "My family always wanted me to study till my post graduation, but I always had interest in fine arts. Still I did Mass Communication but I used to do stuff related to vocal singing and Kathak dance. I took 6 year training in vocal singing and Kathak dance and all apart from my studies. I used to do plays, horse riding, bike & car driving. I did modeling during college days. Sometimes I bunked my colleges lectures for my singing and Kathak training."

Career
Prasad made her television debut in the 2015 television shows name CID and her film debut in the 2019 film  Raajtilak. In 2017, Prasad did many commercial and print ad shoots. She loved to do anchoring, hosting events and shows.

In 2020, she worked on Bhojpuri Industry Premier League (BIPL) SEASON 4 Live anchoring for dhishoom Channel. She did hosting, game played and dance in Roj Hoi Bhoj as celebrity participation, dance performance in “Diwali Carnival“ and "Chhat Pooja" for Big Ganga television channel. She performed a dance performance in “Holi" Show for B4U Bhojpuri.

In 2021, she did acting and hosting "Hansi ki rail chut na jaaye" (comedy show). She performed lead acting in the Web series name- "Luv Guru" in an upcoming digital channel name.  She did an audio music album Zindagi Jhand baa, Phir bhi ghamand baa rap song, sung by herself and Raju Singh Mahi it was released by Worldwide Bhojpuri music company.

Television

Filmography

Music videos
 Zindagi Jhand Ba Phir Bhi Ghamand Ba

Webseries

Awards and nominations

References

External links

1992 births
Living people
Actresses from Mumbai
Indian film actresses
Indian television actresses
21st-century Indian actresses